Tracy Byrnes (born 1970) is an American television business news anchor, journalist, and accountant who worked for the Fox Business Network. Byrnes appeared as a recurring panelist on Fox Business Channel stocks and investment news programs Cashin' In, Bulls & Bears and Your World with Neil Cavuto. She formerly hosted the 1 P.M. ET weekday FBN Live on FoxNews.com Live. She joined Fox Business Network as a reporter in October 2007 after being a recurring guest since 2005. She left Fox Business Network in March 2015.

Early life and education
Byrnes, born into a Sicilian-American family, was raised in northern New Jersey and is a 1992 graduate of Lehigh University with a B.A. in economics and two English minors.  After college, Byrnes embarked on a career at Ernst & Young LLP as a senior accountant. Byrnes later advanced her education with an M.B.A. in accounting from Rutgers University Graduate School of Management.

Career as Columnist, Author
Byrnes began her financial journalism career in 1997.  As a freelance business columnist, Byrnes has written columns for The Wall Street Journal and the New York Post. Prior to freelancing, she spent four years as a senior writer for TheStreet.com, In 2008, Byrnes released her first book, Break Down Your Money: How to Get Beyond the Noise to Profit in the Markets. In 2015, Byrnes founded WineOnTheStreet.com, a wine-focused content site.

Family
Byrnes is divorced. She is a mother of three children, two girls and a boy. She implied on national TV that she's still receiving alimony after the divorce because she has 3 kids, despite her public claims that women do not need men's money.

References

External links
IMDB bio
Tracy Byrnes bio at premierespeakers.com
Tracy Byrnes @ Wineonthestreet.com
Tracy Byrnes @ FamilyProof.com

1970 births
American accountants
Women accountants
American business and financial journalists
American people of Italian descent
American television news anchors
Lehigh University alumni
Living people
People from New Jersey
Rutgers University alumni
Women in finance
American women television journalists
Women business and financial journalists
21st-century American women
Fox Business people